This a list of hillforts on the Isle of Man. Found across Europe and the British Isles, hillforts are a type of prehistoric archaeological site dating to the Bronze Age and Iron Age, and to a lesser extent the post-Roman period. They are classically defined as small hilltop settlements fortified with earthworks, but many are not located on hills, and probably did not function as forts. Their function is unclear; although conventionally interpreted as defensive fortifications and centres of economic political power, there is little evidence that they were ever attacked, and more recent scholarship has suggested that they may be better interpreted as monuments.

According to the Atlas of Hillforts of Britain and Ireland, there are up to twenty eight extant hillforts on Mann itself, and possibly two on the Calf of Man. All but two are on the coast.

Ayre 
 Cashtal Ree Gorree, also known as Balyhamig, a promontory fort located on the northwestern shore of the island. The site was first reported by German archaeologist Gerhard Bersu, who surveyed the island whilst being held there as a prisoner of war, in 1949. P. J. Fowler of the RCHME revisited the site in 1984 and suggested it may in fact be a natural feature. 
 Cronk Sumark 
 Vowlan

Garff 
 Ballure 
 The Cashtal 
 Gob ny Garvain 
 Maughold Head

Glenfaba 
 Borrane Ballelby 
 Borrane Creglea 
 Buggane Mooar 
 Cronk Mooar ny Traagh 
 Niarbyl 
 Peel Castle 
 Port y Candas

Middle 
 Cass ny Hawin 
 Cronk ny Merriu 
 Little Switzerland 
 Meary Veg 
 Purt ny Ceebagh 
 Santon Burn

Rushen 
Buroo 
 Burroo Ned 
 Caigher Point 
 Chapel Hill 
 Close ny Chollagh 
 Hango Broogh 
 The Parade 
 Towlfoggy 
 Langness Point 
 South Barrule

References 

Hill forts in the Isle of Man
Geography of the Isle of Man
History of the Isle of Man
Isle of Man